John de Reynham was Archdeacon of Barnstaple from 1350 to c.1352.

References

Archdeacons of Barnstaple